Sparta is an unincorporated community in Buchanan County, in the U.S. state of Missouri.

History
Sparta was originally called Benton, and under the latter name was platted in 1840. A post office called Sparta was established in 1841, and remained in operation until 1865. The community held the county seat until about 1846.

References

Unincorporated communities in Buchanan County, Missouri
Unincorporated communities in Missouri